Diego González Samaniego (died 22 Dec 1611) was a Roman Catholic prelate who served as Bishop of Mondoñedo (1599–1611).

Biography
On 1 Feb 1599, Diego González Samaniego was selected by the King of Spain and confirmed by Pope Clement VIII as Bishop of Mondoñedo. On 11 Jul 1599, he was consecrated by Juan Alonso Moscoso, Bishop of León with Gonzalo Gutiérrez Montilla, Bishop of Oviedo, and Juan Zarzola, Bishop of Astorga, serving as co-consecrators. He served as Bishop of Mondoñedo until his death on 22 Dec 1611. While bishop, he served as the principal co-consecrator of Francisco Terrones del Caño, Bishop of Tui (1601).

References 

1565 births
1630 deaths
16th-century Roman Catholic bishops in Spain
Bishops appointed by Pope Clement VIII